The Kids from the Port is a 2013 Spanish drama film directed by Alberto Morais. It competed in the main competition section of the 35th Moscow International Film Festival. It was screened in the Contemporary World Cinema section at the 2013 Toronto International Film Festival.

Cast
 José Luis de Madariaga as Miguel's Grandfather
 Sergio Caballero as Barman
 Omar Krim as Miguel
 Mikel Sarasa as Guillermo
 Blanca Bautista as Lola

References

External links
 

2013 films
Spanish drama films
2010s Spanish-language films
2013 drama films
2010s Spanish films